

Works 
The following is a substantially incomplete list of the works of Edith Maryon.

References

Bibliography 
  
  
  
  
  
  
  
  
  
  
  
  
  
  
  
  
 
  
  
  
  
  
  
  
  
  
  
  
  

Artists from London
English women sculptors
20th-century British sculptors
20th-century British women artists
20th-century English women
20th-century English people